1-Hexyne  is a hydrocarbon consisting of a straight six-carbon chain having a terminal alkyne. A colorless liquid, it is one of three isomers of hexyne. It is used as a reagent in organic synthesis.

Synthesis and reactions 
1-Hexyne can be prepared by the reaction of sodium acetylide with butyl bromide:
 

Its reactivity illustrates the behavior of terminal alkylacetylenes.  The hexyl derivative is common test substrate because it is conveniently volatile.  It undergoes deprotonation at C-3 and C-1 with butyl lithium:  
 
This reaction allows alkylation at the 3-position.

Catechol borane adds to 1-hexyne to give the 1-hexenyl borane.

1-Hexyne reacts with diethyl fumarate to produce .

See also 
 2-Hexyne
 3-Hexyne

References 

Alkynes